Art of Labor is a cultural arts program sponsored by the Workforce Development Institute.  These art, writing, and photography workshops create positive images of workers across New York State, teaching communication skills, building a community within the Labor Movement, and encouraging worker dignity.  From 2004 to 2009, The Art of Labor program was called UnseenamericaNYS, which was a collaboration with Unseenamerica founder, writer and artist Esther Cohen, Bread and Roses Cultural Project the Cultural Project of SEIU 1199 in New York City, and The NYS AFL-CIO.

Mission

Art of Labor & Unseenamerica NYS is an innovative arts project that gives workers, immigrants and refugees the tools to document their own experience and describe their worlds with the assistance of professional photographers.  The program embodies the transformative power of looking, for a moment, through another’s eyes.  The goal is to amplify the creativity and vision of voices that often go unheard, and to use artistic expression as an exercise in democracy with the integration of these voices into the larger social and cultural fabric of the nation. The photography and writing workshops are 10- to 12-week art and writing courses led by professional writers and photographers.  Over the course of the workshop participants are given cameras and instructed to document their lives. So far, 300 individuals have told their visual life stories in 60 public spaces, large and small.

Exhibitions

The final works of art are exhibited to the public after the workshop has been completed.  The exhibit spaces range from Labor Union halls and libraries, to community centers, museums, and historical societies.
 
One of the most remarkable exhibits was on June 2 to October 21, 2007 at The New York State Museum in Albany, NY:
"Unseenamerica NYS: Pictures of Working Life Taken by Working Hands" featured large 5x5 cloth banners of photographs and stories by healthcare workers, tractor-trailer drivers, janitors, security guards, teachers, immigrants from India and Peru, refugees from Burma, Bosnia, Darfur, Somalia and scores of others.

Another notable exhibit was from April 5 to April 30, 2005 at the Bread and Roses 1199 Art Gallery in New York City.
"Graphic Work Imaging Today’s Labor Movement", a poster contest curated by Josh MacPhee and Zoeann Murphy, and sponsored by the Graphic work curated by Josh MacPhee and Zoeann Murphy, Workforce Development Institute, Bread and Roses Cultural Project of SEIU 1199, and JustSeeds.

The "Graphic Work" exhibit displayed that the American labor movement has an amazing history of graphic production, creating some of the most effective political images in the history of this country.  However, work and workers, along with the labor movement, are often depicted as experiences of the American past: paintings of Joe Hill, photographs from the early 1900s of children working in factories, historic strikes and Rosie the Riveter. Today’s workforce looks dramatically different from the majority of images used to depict labor.  To address this issue we asked innovative artists to create posters that depict contemporary jobs, the people that do them and the issues workers now face.

Arts organizations based in New York (state)